Lohe-Rickelshof is a municipality in the district of Dithmarschen, in Schleswig-Holstein, Germany.

Notable residents

Hans Bothmann (1911–1946), German Nazi SS concentration camp commandant

References

Municipalities in Schleswig-Holstein
Dithmarschen